By-elections to Pudukottai constituency  was held in Tamil Nadu on 8 February 1997. Elections for two state assembly constituencies, Coonoor and Aruppukottai were held on 22 February 1998.

The results were a sweep for the DMK. However, all three seats were held by DMK from the 1996 election, and there was a significant improvement by the AIADMK, losing by very small margins in all three constituencies.

Constituents and Results
Source: Election Commission of India

Pudukottai

Coonoor

Aruppukottai

See also
1.  ECI By-election page

References

State Assembly elections in Tamil Nadu
1990s in Tamil Nadu
By-elections in Tamil Nadu
1997 State Assembly elections in India
1998 State Assembly elections in India